Matthew 'Bubble' Shanahan (born 13 July 1976) is an Australian former professional basketball player. He played for the South Dragons in the Australian National Basketball League (NBL
At 6 foot 5 inches tall, Shanahan was a versatile player who can play most positions on the floor. He led the NBL in three point percentage in 1999.

Shanahan attended at the Australian Institute of Sport in 1993. He débuted in the NBL in 1992, and has since played for nine teams in his career in the league and for the Kilsyth Cobras in the SEABL. He has played for the following teams:

1992–93: South East Melbourne Magic (NBL Championship, 1992)
1994–98: North Melbourne Giants (NBL Championship, 1994)
1998/99: Brisbane Bullets
1999/2000: Cairns Taipans
2000–02: Wollongong Hawks (NBL Championship, 2001)
2002/03: Canberra Cannons
2003/04: Hunter Pirates
2004–06: Perth Wildcats
2006–2008: South Dragons
2009–2012: Coffs Harbour Suns

References

External links
NBL profile

1976 births
Living people
Australian men's basketball players
Australian Institute of Sport basketball players
Brisbane Bullets players
Cairns Taipans players
Canberra Cannons players
Hunter Pirates players
North Melbourne Giants players
Perth Wildcats players
South Dragons players
South East Melbourne Magic players
Wollongong Hawks players
Guards (basketball)